Henry William Lapczyk Vera (born 17 April 1978) is a retired Paraguayan footballer who played as a goalkeeper. He was most recently the head coach of Real Potosí.

Career
Lapczyk began playing professionally in his native Paraguay, most notably for Club Olimpia where his success led to a brief spell with the Paraguay national football team. He moved to Chile to join CD Huachipato, but returned to Paraguay shortly after. He spent the last seven years of his career in Bolivia with Club Real Potosí.

References

External links
 Henry Lapczyk at Football-Lineups
 
 

1978 births
Living people
People from Fernando de la Mora, Paraguay
Paraguayan footballers
Paraguay international footballers
Club Olimpia footballers
Cerro Corá footballers
General Caballero Sport Club footballers
Sportivo Luqueño players
Chilean Primera División players
C.D. Huachipato footballers
Club Real Potosí players
Association football goalkeepers
Expatriate footballers in Chile
Expatriate footballers in Bolivia
Paraguayan people of Polish descent
Club Real Potosí managers